Shevchenkove is an urban-type settlement in Ukraine in Kupiansk Raion, Kharkiv Oblast. It hosts the administration of Shevchenkove settlement hromada, one of the hromadas of Ukraine. Population: 

The main railway station in Schevchenkove is Schevchenkove-South.

History 

It started in 1896 as a village named Bulacelovka after the owner of that land, Bulacel. It was located in Kharkov Governorate of the Russian Empire.

A local newspaper is published here since February 1935.

During World War II it was under German occupation from February 1942 to February 1943.

Shevchenkove has been considered an urban-type settlement since 1957.

In January 1989 the population was 7,856 people, by January 2013 the population was 7,100 people, and by January 2018 the population was 6,875 people.

The settlement contains a railway station and a three-star hotel, the Kharkov.

Until 18 July 2020, Shevchenkove was the administrative center of Shevchenkove Raion. The raion was abolished in July 2020 as part of the administrative reform of Ukraine, which reduced the number of raions of Kharkiv Oblast to seven, and the area of Shevchenkove Raion was merged into Kupiansk Raion.

During the 2022 Russian invasion of Ukraine, Russian forces captured Shevchenkove on March 11, 2022, and was liberated by Ukrainian forces about 6 months later on September 8.

Gallery

References

External links

Embassy of Ukraine to the State of Israel

Urban-type settlements in Kupiansk Raion